Dajia may refer to:

 Dajia District, district in Taichung City, Taiwan
 Dajia River, river in north-central Taiwan
 Dajia Station, railway station in Taichung City, Taiwan
 Dajia Jenn Lann Temple, temple in the eponymous district in Taichung, Taiwan
 Peter Dajia (born January 27, 1964) is a Canadian shot putter
Tencent Dajia, an opinion blog